The Circle City Classic is an annual American football game featuring two historically black colleges/universities (HBCUs) and played in Indianapolis, Indiana. The event was established in 1984 and has been played every year except 2020, when it was canceled due to the COVID-19 pandemic. The game was held from 1984 to 2007 in the RCA Dome and was moved to the new Lucas Oil Stadium in 2008. In addition to the weekend game, there is also a parade, pageant coronation, and concert related to the Classic.

Game results

* Denotes a tie

See also
 List of black college football classics
 List of attractions and events in Indianapolis

References

External links
 

Black college football classics
College football in Indiana
Sports competitions in Indianapolis
1983 establishments in Indiana
Recurring sporting events established in 1983